Mike Brown (born February 9, 1989) is the associate head coach and wide receivers coach for the Wisconsin Badgers. He was previously the Running Backs coach for the Liberty Flames and a former wide receiver and punt returner who played in the National Football League. He was signed by the Jacksonville Jaguars as an undrafted free agent in 2012. He played college football at Liberty, where he played quarterback. He played football at Monticello High School.

Professional career

Jacksonville Jaguars
Brown signed with the Jacksonville Jaguars following the 2012 NFL draft as a rookie free agent.

Brown was originally invited to a workout with the Jaguars, and after an impressive showing, he was offered a contract. He spent most of the 2012 season on the team's practice squad before being promoted to the active roster on December 18.

Brown scored his first career touchdown on a 29-yard reception from quarterback Chad Henne against the San Francisco 49ers in London.

He was released on November 28, 2014. He was signed to Jacksonville's practice squad on December 2, 2014.

Carolina Panthers
On January 15, 2015, Brown signed with the Carolina Panthers to a futures contract. On September 5, 2015, he was released by the Panthers.

Coaching career

Liberty
Brown first joined the coaching staff at his alma mater Liberty as the Running Backs coach.

Cincinnati
Brown joined the Cincinnati Bearcats for the 2019 season as the Wide Receiver coach.

After the 2021 season, Brown received the additional role of passing game coordinator after the promotion of Gino Guidugli to offensive coordinator.

References

External links
Carolina Panthers bio
Delaware Fightin' Blue Hens bio
Jacksonville Jaguars bio
Liberty Flames bio

1989 births
Living people
Sportspeople from Charlottesville, Virginia
Players of American football from Virginia
Liberty Flames football players
American football wide receivers
American football quarterbacks
American football return specialists
Jacksonville Jaguars players
Carolina Panthers players